Kärevere may refer to several places in Estonia:

Kärevere, Järva County, village in Türi Parish, Järva County
Kärevere, Tartu County, village in Laeva Parish, Tartu County
Kärevere, Viljandi County, village in Suure-Jaani Parish, Viljandi County